Carex rutenbergiana is a tussock-forming species of perennial sedge in the family Cyperaceae. It is native to central parts of Madagascar.

See also
List of Carex species

References

rutenbergiana
Taxa named by Johann Otto Boeckeler
Plants described in 1880
Flora of Madagascar